Frankfort may refer to:

Places

Germany 
 Frankfurt am Main, alternative name. "Frankfort" is the form of the name in the Hessian and Palatine dialects which are spoken in the region where Frankfurt is located.

South Africa 
 Frankfort, Eastern Cape
 Frankfort, Free State

United Kingdom 
 Frankfort, Norfolk, England

United States 
 Frankfort, Alabama, an unincorporated community
 Frankfort, Illinois, a village
 Frankfort, Franklin County, Illinois, an unincorporated community
 Frankfort, Indiana
 Frankfort, Kansas
 Frankfort, Kentucky, the state capital and best-known U.S. city with this name
 Frankfort, Maine
 Frankfort, Michigan
 Frankfort (town), New York
 Frankfort (village), New York, within the town of Frankfort
 Frankfort, Lucas County, Ohio
 Frankfort, Ohio (in Ross County)
 Frankfort, South Dakota
 Frankfort, Washington, a ghost town in Pacific County
 Frankfort, Marathon County, Wisconsin, town
 Frankfort, Pepin County, Wisconsin, town
 Frankfort Township (disambiguation), several places

People 
 Frank Frankfort Moore (1855–1931), British dramatist, novelist and poet
 Henri Frankfort (1897–1954), Dutch Egyptologist, archaeologist and orientalist
 Jacob Frankfort (born 1801), first Jewish immigrant from Poland to Los Angeles, United States

Other uses 
 The Frankfort meteorite of 1868, which fell in Alabama, United States (see meteorite falls)

See also 
 Frankford (disambiguation)
 Frankfurt (disambiguation)